Karl Salb (born May 19, 1949) is a retired American shot putter.  Competing for the University of Kansas he won six successive NCAA Championships, three each Indoors and Outdoors.  No other athlete has won more than four.  Additionally, he finished fourth at the Olympic Trials in 1968 and sixth in 1972.

He was also the 1971  United States champion.

In an era when there was no money to be made in amateur track and field, Salb was drafted by the Buffalo Bills in the 14th round of the 1972 NFL Draft.  The married "Gentle Giant" chose not to pursue the sport and remain an amateur.

While competing for Crossett High School in 1967, Salb set the National High School Record for the shot put at 69' 7"

References

External links

American male shot putters
Kansas Jayhawks men's track and field athletes
1949 births
Living people
People from Crossett, Arkansas
Pan American Games medalists in athletics (track and field)
Pan American Games silver medalists for the United States
Athletes (track and field) at the 1971 Pan American Games
Medalists at the 1971 Pan American Games